The Institute for Theoretical and Experimental Physics (ITEP; Russian Институт теоретической и экспериментальной физики) is a multi-disciplinary research center located in Moscow, Russia. ITEP carries out research in the fields of theoretical and mathematical physics, astrophysics, high energy particle physics, nuclear physics, plasma physics, solid state physics, nanotechnology, reactor and accelerator physics, medical physics, and computer science. ITEP also maintains an extensive educational program and organizes physics schools for scholars and undergraduates. The institute  is located near the corner of the Sevastopol prospect and the Nachimowski prospect (address Bolschaja Cheremuskinskaja 25) and occupies part of the former estate "Cheryomushki-Znamenskoye" - an 18th-century manor that is a monument of architecture and landscape art of the 18th-19th centuries.

History 
ITEP was established on December 1, 1945, initially carrying the name "Laboratory №3", with the purpose of conceiving a heavy water nuclear reactor and cosmic ray studies. Developed of the theoretical part KS 150. The laboratory worked with nuclear reactor development in the 1940s and over the years the institute expanded its research programme into high energy particle physics, astrophysics, medical physics and other related fields.

The founder and director until 1968 was Abram Alikhanov.

ITEP scientists won 8 Lenin awards and 29 state awards during the Soviet Union.

A research program to research nuclear fusion using heavy ion accelerators was started in the 1980s.

At the moment (2008), the focus areas are theoretical and mathematical physics (e.g. quantum field theory and string theory), astrophysics, elementary particle physics (e.g. they are involved in working with DESY and CERN experiments), nuclear physics, plasma physics, solid state physics, nanotechnologies, nuclear reactor technology, accelerator physics, medical physics (such as PET devices, cancer treatment with the proton accelerator) and computer science. They were one of the first Russian institutes networked on the World Wide Web and operate the Moscow mirror of the Arxiv preprint server.

Facilities 

From 1949 the ITEP maintained a heavy water reactor (there is still a Maket heavy water reactor there) and from 1961 a 7 GeV proton synchrotron, the first Russian particle accelerator with strong focus and prototype for the later 70 GeV accelerator in Protvino. Today they maintain a 10 GeV proton synchrotron and a proton linear accelerator.

Research 
The school conducts original scientific research in several fields of physics and technology. Research areas in theoretical physics concentrate around quantum field theory including the string theory. Experimental research includes active participation in large international projects, such as the CERN's LHC experiments, as well as smaller, national and locally managed projects. The employees are also active in teaching (at undergraduate and masters levels as well as doctorates) and regularly organize conferences, seminars and a winter school.

2012 controversy 
A large group of scientists at the ITEP are protesting about the Russian government's plan to merge ITEP with the Kurchatov Institute. According to them, the real purpose of the move is to effectively "kill" ITEP.

Directors 
 1945–1968 Abram Alikhanov
 1968–1997 Ivan Chuvilo
 1997–2001 Mikhail Danilov
 2001–2005 Alexander Suvorov
 2005–2008 Boris Sharkov
 2008–2009 Vyacheslav Konev
 2009–2010 Nikolai Tyurin
 2010 Vladimir Shevchenko
 2010–2015 Yuri Kozlov
 Since 2015 Viktor Yegorychev

People 

The Russian theoretical physicists Lev Landau (ITEP considers themselves in the tradition of the Landau school) and Isaak Yakovlevich Pomeranchuk, who led a seminar here from the 1950s, were of particular importance. The well-known textbook on quantum electrodynamics by Aleksander Akhiezer and Vladimir Berestetsky was created at the institute in 1953. Other theorists were Vadim Knizhnik, Alexei Morozov, Igor Krichever and Sergei Gukov in the field of string theory, quantum field theory and mathematical physics, Alexander Dolgov in cosmology, . Other important theoretical physicists at the institute were Karen Ter-Martirosian and Lev Okun, both of whom were responsible for the selection of scientists during the Soviet Union, which at the time amounted to a strict "screening".

Pomeranchuk Prize 

Since 1998 ITEP has awarded annually the Pomeranchuk Prize, an international award for theoretical physics. It is named after Russian physicist Isaak Yakovlevich Pomeranchuk, who together with Landau established the Theoretical Physics Department of the Institute.

See also 
 Budker Institute of Nuclear Physics, another Russian particle physics laboratory in Novosibirsk
 Institute for High Energy Physics, another Russian particle physics laboratory in the vicinity of Moscow; located south of Moscow
 Joint Institute for Nuclear Research, international particle physics laboratory in the vicinity of Moscow; located north of Moscow

References

External links 
 www.itep.ru (official website)

Universities and institutes established in the Soviet Union
Research institutes in the Soviet Union
Research institutes in Russia
Physics institutes
1945 establishments in the Soviet Union
1945 establishments in Russia
Organizations established in 1945
Nuclear research institutes in Russia